Roel Moors (born 16 December 1978) is a Belgian retired professional basketball player and current head coach of BG Göttingen of the Basketball Bundesliga.

Playing career
Moors usually played at the point guard position. He was also a member of the Belgian national basketball team, whom he played with at the European championships of 2011 and 2013. He played more than 100 matches for the Belgian national team.

On 8 October 2015 Moors' jersey number 4 was retired by Antwerp Giants.

Coaching career

Antwerp Giants
Starting from the 2015–16 season, Moors was an assistant coach with Antwerp Giants. In November 2015, after Paul Vervaeck was fired, he was promoted to head coach. In September 2016, Moors won his first trophy as coach when his team won the Belgian Supercup over Oostende.

In the 2018–19 campaign, Moors unexpectedly led Antwerp to the third place in the Basketball Champions League. He was also awarded with the title Basketball Champions League Best Coach. He won the Coach of the Year of the domestic PBL again in May 2019. In June 2019, it was announced that Moors would leave the club.

Bamberg
On 20 June 2019, Brose Bamberg of the German Basketball Bundesliga (BBL) announced that Moors had signed a two-year contract.

Göttingen
On July 13, 2020, he has signed with BG Göttingen of the Basketball Bundesliga.

References

External links
Eurobasket.com profile
Basketball Reference profile

1978 births
Living people
Antwerp Giants coaches
Antwerp Giants players
ASVEL Basket players
Belgian men's basketball players
Bree BBC players
Brose Baskets coaches
Brussels Basketball players
Gent Hawks players
Guards (basketball)
Leuven Bears players
People from Herentals
Spirou Charleroi players
Sportspeople from Antwerp Province
Belgian expatriate basketball people in France
Belgian expatriate basketball people in Germany